Petasiella is a monotypic genus of hydrozoans belonging to the family Petasidae. The only species is Petasiella asymmetrica.

The species is found in Malesia.

References

Petasidae
Hydrozoan genera
Monotypic cnidarian genera